Lamoille is a rural census-designated place in Elko County in the northeastern section of the state of Nevada in the western United States. As of the 2020 census it had a population of 276.

Demographics

History
The early history of the community and surrounding area is summarized in a nearby highway marker:

LAMOILLE VALLEY - Because heavy use denuded the grass from the main Fort Hall route of the California Emigrant Trail along the Humboldt River, many emigrants left the river near Starr Valley. They skirted the East Humboldt Range and the Ruby Mountains along a Shoshone Indian path, rested their livestock in Lamoille Valley, and returned to the Humboldt River.

John Walker and Thomas Waterman first settled the area in 1865. Waterman named the valley after his native Vermont. In 1868, Walker erected the Cottonwood Hotel, store and blacksmith shop in the valley, and the settlement became known as "The Crossroads." Here wagons were repaired and food and supplies could be obtained. The original buildings and the more recent 20-bedroom Lamoille hotel, creamery, flour mill and dance hall are gone.

Lamoille is nestled off the western flanks of the Ruby Mountains at the end of Nevada State Route 227, and is the principal gateway to this range via the National Forest Scenic Byway up Lamoille Canyon. In 1907 a small church was constructed on the east side of the community, and is still in use today.

Former Disney president and good friend of Clint Eastwood, Frank Wells, died in a helicopter crash here in the Nevada Ruby Mountains.

Gallery

See also
 List of census-designated places in Nevada

References

External links

 Lamoille history
 Lamoille's Little Church of the Crossroads

Elko, Nevada micropolitan area
Ruby Mountains
Census-designated places in Elko County, Nevada
Populated places established in 1865
Census-designated places in Nevada